Heavy: The Story of Metal is a four-part documentary special that aired on VH1 in 2006.

The series focuses on the origins, subgenres and the bands of heavy metal music, paying close attention to influential bands like Black Sabbath, Led Zeppelin, Judas Priest and Iron Maiden, who helped to define heavy metal in its early years.  Other bands on the program include Alice Cooper, Kiss, AC/DC, Van Halen, Europe, Def Leppard, Quiet Riot, Mötley Crüe, Megadeth, Metallica, Anthrax, Guns N' Roses and Marilyn Manson. However, the documentary notably passes over lower profile metal subgenres such as death metal, black metal, doom metal, progressive metal, power metal and many others considered core elements of today's metal pantheon, focusing mostly on hard rock and traditional heavy metal. The documentary aired in Canada on MuchMoreMusic and on C4 in New Zealand. It is not available on DVD or video.

Summary
The show is broken down into four parts. Each part focuses on different eras of the genre.

Part One: Welcome to My Nightmare
This part of the documentary talks about the beginning of heavy metal music and how the term came about. It also documents punk rock's threat to heavy metal's popularity. Bands discussed include Black Sabbath, Led Zeppelin, Alice Cooper, Kiss, and AC/DC.

Part Two: British Steel
This part focuses on the rise of the new wave of British heavy metal, the Soundhouse in London and the beginning of the L.A. scene with Van Halen. It also talks about Ronnie James Dio's influence on the birth of the "devil horns" and metal's leather fashion brought on by Rob Halford. Bands discussed include Judas Priest, Iron Maiden, Van Halen, and Def Leppard.

Part Three: Looks That Kill
Part Three focuses mostly on the glam metal movement of the 80s, the use of keyboards in metal, the "power ballad", and the decline of the genre. It also talks about the P.M.R.C hearings, the 1984 film This is Spinal Tap and the 1988 "rockumentary" The Decline of Western Civilization Part II: The Metal Years. Only two bands were discussed in this episode (Mötley Crüe, and Quiet Riot), while most of the episode focuses on glam metal's effects to the music industry.

Part Four: Seek & Destroy
This part talks about the emergence of the underground sound of thrash metal in the 80's and the popularity of Guns N' Roses. It also talks about the popularity rise in nu metal, the influence of Marilyn Manson, and the beginning of Ozzfest. The documentary ends with saying how heavy metal has entered a "golden age" of sorts, with many classic bands returning to the stage and performing once again. Bands discussed include Metallica, Anthrax, and Guns N' Roses.

Interviews
The documentary features interviews from several heavy metal singers, musicians, music journalist, DJs, music historians, VJs, and record producers.

See also
 Metal: A Headbanger's Journey, a similar 2005 documentary film by Sam Dunn.
 Metal Evolution, a similar 2011-2012 VH1 series, also by Dunn.

External links
VH1 Official Website

Documentary television series about music
VH1 original programming
Documentary films about heavy metal music and musicians